Statistics of the Turkish First Football League for the 1966–67 season.

Overview
It was contested by 17 teams, and Beşiktaş J.K. won the championship.

League table

Results

References
Turkey - List of final tables (RSSSF)

Süper Lig seasons
1966–67 in Turkish football
Turkey